Hervé Léger, sometimes deliberately written as Herve Leger, is a French fashion house founded by the designer Hervé Peugnet, also known as Hervé L. Leroux.

History 
Hervé Léger was founded in 1985 by the designer Hervé Peugnet (1957–2017). The same year Karl Lagerfeld advised Peugnet that his surname Peugnet would be too difficult for Americans, the target market, to pronounce, and instead suggested the surname Léger. Having lost the rights to the Hervé Léger name, Peugnet later took a third "brand" name as Hervé L. Leroux in 2000.

As early as 1982, however, the fashion press was already referring to Peugnet as Hervé Léger, as that was the year he gained international attention for leading a design team at Chanel that revamped the Chanel silhouette, a year before Karl Lagerfeld took over the house. Peugnet had previously worked as an assistant to Lagerfeld and was likely influenced by Lagerfeld in his 1982 reworking of the Chanel look, a reworking that bore hallmarks of the body-conscious trend of the time, a trend followed by a number of eighties designers beginning in the late seventies, including Lagerfeld, Peugnet/Leger, Thierry Mugler, and, most famously, Azzedine Alaïa, to whom Peugnet's work would frequently be compared in the future. Peugnet altered the Chanel silhouette by broadening the shoulder, shortening the jacket, shortening and tightening the skirt, raising the heel height, and increasing the scale of the jewelry and purses, all controversial moves initially.

Along with Azzedine Alaïa, who had introduced the style by 1985, Peugnet pioneered the creation of so-called bandage dresses, so-called "body-con" (body-conscious) garments made using materials traditionally associated with foundation garments to create bandage dresses that would mold and shape the wearer's figure with its signature bandage-like strips.

One of the peculiarities of Hervé Léger garments is that they are knitted, not woven.

In September 1998, Hervé Léger was acquired by the BCBG Max Azria Group from the Seagram's Group. This was the first-ever acquisition of a French couturier by an American designer, though Azria is Tunisian and grew up in France. Ohana & Co., a boutique investment bank, advised Seagram's on the sale.

In April 2007, Max Azria relaunched the Hervé Léger brand under his own design direction with a capsule summer collection, which was offered at select department stores and specialty boutiques. In August 2007, the remodeled Hervé Léger boutique opened on Rodeo Drive in Beverly Hills. In February 2008, Max Azria presented the Hervé Léger by Max Azria collection at Bryant Park during the Fall 2008 New York Fashion Week.

Hervé Léger stores can be found in various international locations, including Moscow.

References

External links
 
 
 Style.com Designer Directory: Herve Leger by Max Azria

Clothing companies of France
Clothing brands